Pataveh (also Romanized as Pātāveh) is a village in Milas Rural District, in the Central District of Lordegan County, Chaharmahal and Bakhtiari Province, Iran. At the 2006 census, its population was 69, in 13 families.

References 

Populated places in Lordegan County